Catoblepia is a genus of Neotropical butterflies in the family Nymphalidae. Larvae feed on bananas and adults feed on rotting fruit.

Species
Listed alphabetically within groups:
The generosa species group:
Catoblepia berecynthia (Cramer, [1777])
Catoblepia generosa (Stichel, 1902)
The xanthus species group:
Catoblepia amphirhoe (Hübner, [1825])
Catoblepia versitincta (Stichel, 1901)
Catoblepia xanthicles (Godman & Salvin, [1881])
Catoblepia xanthus (Linnaeus, 1758)
Unknown species group:
Catoblepia orgetorix (Hewitson, 1870) – Orgetorix owl
Catoblepia soranus (Westwood, 1851)

References

Morphinae
Nymphalidae of South America
Nymphalidae genera
Taxa named by Hans Ferdinand Emil Julius Stichel